Vadilal Jechand Dagli (1926-1985) was Gujarati poet, essayist, leading economist and journalist of India.

Life
Vadilal Dagli was born on 20 November 1926 in Rojid village near Dhandhuka to Jechandbhai and Champaben Dagli. He completed his primary education from Veraval and secondary education from Sheth Chimanlal Nagindas Vidyalaya, Ahmedabad. He matriculated in 1944. In 1948, he completed BA and went to US for further studies. He studied MA in International Politics and Business from University of California Berkeley. He returned to India in 1951 and joined Press Trust of India. Later he served as the financial editor of The Indian Express. He was appointed the Chief Officer of Mumbai Head Office of State Bank of India in 1963. He became an editor of the economic weekly, Commerce in 1967 and he was considered as the prominent economist in the country. He chaired Committee of Control and Subsidies of Government of India (1978–79). He founded Parichay Trust and served as its Managing Trustee. The Trust published short biographies for general education of people. He died on 6 December 1985 in Mumbai.

Works
He was chiefly an essayist. His Shiyalani Savarno Tadako (1975) includes his personal and autobiographical essays. Ranknu Aayojan (1980) includes essays on economics. Kavita Bhani (1982) includes literary essays. Thoda Nokha Jeev (1985) has biographical essays such as of Sukhlal Sanghvi, Swami Anand, Winston Churchill, Charlie Chaplin.

Sahaj (1976) is a collection of poems. Suna Sukan (1954) is a novel written with Yashawant Doshi. With Doshi, he translated And One Did Not Come Back by K. A. Abbas as Dr. Kotnis (1949) in Gujarati. He also edited memorial book on Jhaverchand Meghani with Doshi, Sauno Ladakvayo (1947).

He had also written about twenty short biographies for Parichay Trust. He had also edited 12 books in English.

He wrote a column Mumbai-ni Diary, focused on Mumbai and issues of India, in Ruchi magazine.

Awards
He was awarded Narmad Suvarna Chandrak in 1975 for Shiyalani Savarno Tadako.

Selected bibliography

References

Gujarati-language poets
Gujarati-language writers
20th-century Indian essayists
Journalists from Gujarat
20th-century Indian poets
1926 births
1985 deaths
English-language writers from India
Poets from Gujarat
20th-century Indian journalists